The Birth of Loud: Leo Fender, Les Paul, and the Guitar-Pioneering Rivalry That Shaped Rock 'n' Roll is a 2019 book by Ian S. Port that examines the impacts of Leo Fender and Les Paul, and their rivalry, on rock music. The book has five "positive" reviews and five "rave" reviews, according to review aggregator Book Marks.

References

2019 non-fiction books
English-language books
Charles Scribner's Sons books